Real Live! is a double live album by Frank Marino & Mahogany Rush released on 9 November 2004 by Justin Time Records.  The tracks from the first CD were re-released on 24 October 2020 as a limited edition (1,000 copies) double vinyl LP as part of Record Store Day.

Track listing

Disc 1 
"Voodoo Chile" - 10:02
"Something's Comin' Our Way (Excerpt)" - 2:38
"He's Calling" - 14:39
"Red House" - 12:11
"Guitar Prelude to a Hero" - 2:22
"Stories of a Hero" - 9:51
"Poppy" - 17:24
"She's Not There" - 1:42
"Crossroads" - 3:53
"She's Not There (Return)" - 0:41
"Poppy (Return)" - 2:31

Disc 2 
"Let There Be" - 3:11
"Strange Universe" - 3:23
"Ode to Creation" - 10:07
"Strange Universe" - 3:07
"Rock and Roll Hall of Fame" - 2:50
"Ain't Dead Yet (excerpt)" - 1:34
"Slippin' and Slidin" - 1:19
"Back to the Hall" - 2:50
"Two and Four (Just Joshin')" - 6:35 
"Avalon" - 7:30
"Rumble 'n' Roll (For Pete's Sake)" - 1:43
"Jazzed for a Moment" - 1:54
"Tales of the Unexpected" - 4:16
"Return to Avalon" - 2:15
"Rattle of Sabres" - 1:19
"Electric Reflections of War" - 4:49
"Aftermath" - 1:07
"The World Anthem" - 2:12
"A Prayer for Peace" - 2:22
"Somewhere over the Rainbow" - 2:19
"Try for Freedom" - 12:31

Personnel
Frank Marino - vocals, guitar, producer, engineer, mixing
Mick Layne - guitar
Peter Dowse - bass
Josh Trager - drums

References

2004 live albums
Mahogany Rush albums
SPV/Steamhammer live albums